The Ikuhane people, also known as the Subiya or Subia, are a Bantu-speaking ethnic group who are native to Southern Africa, primarily Namibia. They form part of Namibia’s Zambezi people and are also found in large numbers in Botswana and Zambia. Their language is the Ikuhane language (Chikuhane) also known as the Subia language (Chisubia).

Name

They get their name from the second known Subia King, Ikuhane, who reigned until the 1570s. A single Ikuhane person is referred to as Muikuhane while many Ikuhane people are referred to as Baikuhane. The prefix Mu- is singular and the prefix Ba- is plural. However, Baikuhane are most popularly known as the Subia. The exonym Subia came from neighbouring people and it is derived from the word ‘subila’ which means light in reference to their light skin complexion. A single Subia person is referred to as Musubia while many Subia people are referred to as Basubia or Masubia.

History

The Subia are a Bantu speaking ethnic group that migrated southward of Africa. Itenge, the first known Subia King’s reign lasted until the 1570s. During this time, he led the migration from the north and settled at Kafue floodplains. Itenge’s son, Ikuhane, succeeded his father and his reign was from 1575 – 1600. Under his leadership, the people migrated from Kafue and settled along the Zambezi valley. They later moved southwards and settled along the Chobe River which the Subia also named Ikuhane River in his honour. Baikuhane simply means the followers of King Ikuhane or the people from the Chobe River and their language is called Chikuhane, also known as Chisubia.

Under the leadership of Lilundu Lituu (1640 – 1665) who succeeded his father Ikuhane, the Subia migrated from the Chobe River southwards and settled in Botswana. In 1876, Mwanamwale and a section of Subia men crossed the Zambezi River and established his leadership at Sesheke in Zambia. Mutwa Liswani II (1965 – 1996) established his royal headquarters at Bukalo in Namibia and is still the Subia headquarters until today.

Social organization

At the head of the family is the eldest male, usually the grandfather. Relation is a result of marriage, birth or adoption.

Marriage is of utmost importance among the Subia as it is a means of cementing and extending family relations. A man of age is expected to have work, have his own homestead called Ilapa and then find a wife to marry. The wife is expected to relocate to her husband’s homestead, joining her in-laws and becoming part of that family. The wife and children take the husband’s surname as they are part of his family. How the married couple manages its ilapa, ensures a particular status in society. Albeit waning in modern times, polygamy is prevalent among the Subia.

Religious beliefs

The Subia have always believed in the existence of the Supreme Being called Ireza. They also call Him Mubumbi which means Creator of all things. The Subia see the constructive utilization of flora for medicinal purposes as sanctioned by the Supreme Being.

Subia astronomy

Astronomy is a natural science that the Subia use to study and interpret celestial objects and phenomena. This includes objects that they could see with their naked eyes, like the sun and moon. The moon is called Mwezi. Its function is for light at night, to tell the month, which is also called Mwezi, and seasons. The sun is called Izuba. Its function is for daylight, (hence why a day is called izuba as well) and the sun is used to tell the time of day used to determine directions.

Subia food and cuisine

The staple food of the Subia is maize meal porridge called Inkoko. It is often eaten with Zambezi Bream fish along with vegetables or the porridge is eaten with milk called Masanza. This dish is often served at gatherings, weddings or funerals.

Subia culture and attire

The Musisi is a dress worn by Subia women. The word musisi means ‘skirt’. It consists of two skirts with a stiffened top layer to keep the shape of the dress. It is popular for the dress to be made from satin and worn with a matching small wrapper around the waist called Cali in Subia.

Subia music

The music performed by the Subia is called Chipelu. Chipelu music and dance are social activities that take place throughout the year at different social events in the community. It is performed by dance groups for the king at his palace or when he visits the communities in their villages. Dancing also takes place at weddings, political rallies or school meetings but not at funerals. Each Chipelu group composes its own songs usually addressing social issues in the community.

Subia arts and crafts

The Subia are fine potters due to their free access to clay soils and wood for the ovens. They are also known for their skill at crafting baskets which can be used in harvesting crops and sifting maize flour. They also make necklaces from beads, mats out of reeds and whole canoes for fishing.

Notable Subia people

Beatrice Masilingi, Olympic Athlete
Kenneth Matengu, Vice-Chancellor of the University of Namibia.
Ryan Nyambe, Football player
Happie Ntelamo, Miss Namibia

References

Ethnic groups in Namibia
Zambezi Region
Ethnic groups in Botswana
Ethnic groups in Zambia
Ethnic groups divided by international borders